Aristotelia ochreella is a moth of the family Gelechiidae. It was described by Rebel in 1927. It is found in Egypt.

References

Moths described in 1927
Aristotelia (moth)
Moths of Africa